Vukovich is a surname. Notable people with the surname include:

Bernice Carr Vukovich (born 1938), South African tennis player
Bill Vukovich (1918–1955), American racing driver
Bill Vukovich II (born 1944), American racing driver
Billy Vukovich III (1963–1990), American racing driver
Frances Vukovich (born 1930), American baseball player
George Vukovich (born 1956), American baseball player
John Vukovich (1947–2007), American baseball player and coach
Martin Vukovich (born 1944), Austrian diplomat
Steve Vukovich (1890–1951), American politician

See also